The following lists events that happened during 1932 in Australia.

Incumbents

Monarch – George V
Governor-General – Sir Isaac Isaacs
Prime Minister – James Scullin (until 6 January), then Joseph Lyons
Chief Justice – Frank Gavan Duffy

State Premiers
Premier of New South Wales – Jack Lang (until 13 May) then Bertram Stevens
Premier of Queensland – Arthur Edward Moore (until 17 June) then William Forgan Smith
Premier of South Australia – Lionel Hill
Premier of Tasmania – John McPhee
Premier of Victoria – Edmond Hogan (until 19 May) then Sir Stanley Argyle
Premier of Western Australia – James Mitchell

State Governors
Governor of New South Wales – Sir Philip Game
Governor of Queensland – Sir John Goodwin (until 7 April), then Sir Leslie Orme Wilson (from 13 June)
Governor of South Australia – Sir Alexander Hore-Ruthven
Governor of Tasmania – none appointed
Governor of Victoria – none appointed
Governor of Western Australia – none appointed

Events
 Unemployment reached a record high of about 32%.
 19 March – The Sydney Harbour Bridge is officially opened by the Premier of New South Wales, Jack Lang.
 30 March – The Grey Street Bridge is officially opened in Brisbane by the Governor of Queensland, Sir John Goodwin.
 13 May – The Premier of New South Wales, Jack Lang, is dismissed by the Governor, Sir Philip Game.
 14 May – A state election is held in Victoria. The Labor Party, already divided over the Premiers' Plan, is heavily defeated by a United Australia Party–United Country Party coalition.
 11 June – A state election in New South Wales, called after the dismissal of Jack Lang as Premier, is held. Lang's Labor Party is heavily defeated, losing 31 seats to the UAP–Country coalition.
 1 July – The Australian Broadcasting Commission (ABC) is established
 2 November – Start of the Emu War.
 23 November – The statue of The Dog on the Tuckerbox is unveiled at Gundagai, New South Wales by Prime Minister Joseph Lyons.
 10 December – The Emu War ends in failure.

Science and technology
 17 August – Botanist John McConnell Black is awarded the Mueller Medal by the Australian and New Zealand Association for the Advancement of Science.

Arts and literature

 Ernest Buckmaster wins the Archibald Prize with his portrait of Sir William Irvine.
 The final issue of Aussie: The Australian Soldiers' Magazine appears.

Film
 4 March – Brigadier-General Iven Giffard Mackay is appointed as the Commonwealth Film Appeals Censor, replacing the Censorship Appeals Board.

Sport
 12 February – Australia defeats South Africa 5–0 in the cricket test series, played in Australia.
 21 March – New South Wales wins the Sheffield Shield.
 Bodyline is first introduced into cricket
 The Australian Olympic team wins 3 gold, 1 silver and 1 bronze medal at the 1932 Summer Olympics held in Los Angeles
 20 March – Racehorse Phar Lap, in Tijuana, Mexico, wins the Agua Caliente Handicap; across Australia, thousands celebrate after the radio broadcast of the race.
 5 April – Racehorse Phar Lap dies midday at ranch in San Francisco, two weeks after winning at Agua Caliente racetrack (2 autopsies find nothing; however, trees had been sprayed with a lead–arsenate insecticide); it is 6 April at 10:30 am in Australia when news spreads.
24 September – The 1932 NSWRFL season culminates in South Sydney's 19–12 victory over Western Suburbs in the premiership final.
 1 October – Richmond defeats Carlton 13.14 (92) to 12.11 (83) at the VFL Grand Final to become premiers of the 1932 VFL season.
 1 November – Peter Pan wins the Melbourne Cup.

Births
 7 January – Joe Berinson, politician (died 2018)
 28 January – Don McMichael, public servant (died 2017)
20 March – Kevin Bacon, equestrian (died 2020)
 2 April – Michael Vernon, consumer activist (died 1993)
 9 April – Gil Brealey, film producer and director (died 2018)
 21 May – Brian Coleman, Australian rules footballer (died 1966)
 10 June – Hedley Bull, political scientist (died 1985)
 6 July – John O'Brien, tennis player
 20 July – Michael Papps, sports shooter (died 2022)  
 28 July – Peter Hughes, ACT politician
 4 September – John Herron, politician (died 2019)
 23 September – Doug Sutherland, Lord Mayor of Sydney (1980–1987)
 26 September – Stan Smith, Australian rules footballer (died 2012)
 11 October – Barry Jones, politician
 22 October – Slim Newton, country singer (died 2023)

Deaths
 17 January – Albert Jacka, businessman, soldier and Victoria Cross recipient (b. 1893)
 6 February – John Earle, 22nd Premier of Tasmania (b. 1865)
 10 April – George Barber, Queensland politician (born in the United Kingdom) (b. 1860)
 27 April – Sir Adrian Knox, 2nd Chief Justice of Australia (b. 1863)
 9 June – Edith Cowan, Western Australian politician and social reformer (b. 1861)
 17 June – Sir John Quick, Victorian politician and lawyer (born in the United Kingdom) (b. 1852)
 23 June – Francis Kenna, Queensland politician, poet and journalist (b. 1865)
 1 July – William Dick, New South Wales politician (b. 1865)
 11 July – William Hartnoll, Tasmanian politician (b. 1841)
 26 July – Sir William McPherson, 31st Premier of Victoria (b. 1865)
 10 October – Sir Bertram Mackennal, sculptor and medalist (died in the United Kingdom) (b. 1863)
 4 December – Mona McBurney, composer (born in the United Kingdom) (b. 1862)

See also
 List of Australian films of the 1930s

References

 
Australia
Years of the 20th century in Australia